Kljaković is a surname. Notable people with the surname include:

 Ivan Kljaković Gašpić (born 1984), Croatian sailor
 Jozo Kljaković (1889–1969), Croatian painter
 Miljen Kljaković (born 1950), Serbian production designer and art director

Croatian surnames